Kevin Cawley (born 17 March 1989) is a Scottish professional footballer who plays as a striker for Scottish League One club Alloa Athletic.

Career
Born in Glasgow, Cawley started his career at Celtic, where he was a high goal scorer for their reserve side.

After being released by Celtic in 2009, Cawley signed for Ayr United on a one-year contract. Cawley made his debut for the Honest Men on 25 July 2009 against Albion Rovers in the Challenge Cup. In March 2010, Cawley was loaned out for a month to Stranraer (in the Third Division) to get some match practice.

He spent the 2010–11 season at East Stirlingshire, then in June 2011 he signed for Alloa Athletic.

After four years with Alloa, Cawley signed for Scottish Championship rivals Dumbarton. He scored his first goal for the club in a 2–0 friendly win over Hearts. His first competitive goal came in a 1–1 draw with East Fife in the Scottish League Cup on 1 August 2015

Cawley was released by Dumbarton in May 2016, subsequently re-signing for recently relegated Alloa Athletic.

Nickname
Due to his small stature, some Alloa Athletic fans have compared Cawley to  the club's top goalscorer for a single season Willie Crilley, referring to him as 'The Mighty Atom' – a term which Wasps fans of the 1920s also used for Crilley.

Career statistics

Honours
Alloa Athletic
Scottish Third Division: 2011–12

References

External links
 
  (Alloa stats, incorrect name)

Living people
1989 births
Scottish footballers
Celtic F.C. players
Ayr United F.C. players
Stranraer F.C. players
East Stirlingshire F.C. players
Alloa Athletic F.C. players
Dumbarton F.C. players
Scottish Football League players
Scottish Professional Football League players
Association football forwards
Footballers from Glasgow